Georges Goyon (19051996) was a French-Egyptian Egyptologist, a senior fellow at the National Centre for Scientific Research, and King Farouk's private archaeologist.

Biography
Goyon was born in Port-Saïd, Egypt, in 1905,  son of Henri Goyon, who worked for the Suez Canal Company.
A student and disciple of Pierre Montet, Goyon led, early in his career, the construction of a gigantic granite monument at Ismaïlia for the Suez Canal Company. For twenty years he led the work of excavation of Tanis and inspected the stones of the Great Pyramid of Cheops to which he practically dedicated his life to, but also did a vast amount of work on the inscriptions and graffiti on the Great Pyramid, making a number of important discoveries especially in the 1940s. In 1946, Goyon discovered an "abecedary incised on black granite" in Wadi Hammamat.

Publications 
As author:
 Les inscriptions et graffiti des voyageurs sur la Grande Pyramide. Préf. de Ét. Drioton. , Société royale de géographie, Cairo, 1944.
 Le papyrus de Turin dit "des Mines d'or" et le Wadi Hammamat, Institut français d'archéologie orientale du Caire, 1949.
 Le Tombeau d'Ankhou à Saqqarah, Paul Geuthner, Paris, 1959.
 Le Secret des bâtisseurs des grandes pyramides - Khéops, Pygmalion Editions, 1983.
 La Découverte des trésors de Tanis, Éditions Perséa, 1987.

As a contributing author:
 	Les constructions et le tombeau de Chéchanq III à Tanis, 1960.
 Histoire générale des techniques. Tome I, Les origines de la civilisation technique, Paris: Presses universitaires de France, 1962.

As an editor:
 Voyage en Égypte d'Anthoine Morison, 1697,  Institut français d'archéologie orientale du Caire, 1976.
 Nouvelles inscriptions rupestres du Wadi Hammamat, Paris: Librairie d'Amérique et d'Orient (Imprimerie nationale), 1957.

References

French Egyptologists
French archaeologists
1905 births
People from Port Said
1996 deaths
20th-century archaeologists
French expatriates in Egypt